is a subway station in Nakano, Tokyo, Japan, jointly operated by the two Tokyo subway operators Tokyo Metro and Toei Subway.

Lines
The station is numbered M-06 on the Marunouchi Line, and E-30 on the Oedo Line.

Station layout

Tokyo Metro platforms
The Tokyo Metro station has two island platforms serving three tracks on the second basement (B2F) level.

During the off-peak, platform 2 is used by three-car branch line trains shuttling between Nakano-Sakue and Honancho. 

Toei platforms
The Toei station has one island platform serving two tracks on the fourth basement (B4F) level.

History

The Tokyo Metro (formerly TRTA) station opened on 8 February 1961. The Toei station opened on 19 December 1997.

The station facilities of the Marunouchi Line were inherited by Tokyo Metro after the privatization of the Teito Rapid Transit Authority (TRTA) in 2004.

Passenger statistics
In fiscal 2011, the Tokyo Metro station was used by an average of 61,969 passengers daily, and the Toei station was used by an average of 33,011 passengers daily (alighting passengers only).

Surrounding area
 Nakano Police Station
 Hozenji Temple
 Tokyo Polytechnic University Nakano campus

See also
 List of railway stations in Japan

References

External links

 Nakano-sakaue Station information (Tokyo Metro) 
 Nakano-sakaue Station information (Toei) 

Toei Ōedo Line
Tokyo Metro Marunouchi Line
Stations of Tokyo Metropolitan Bureau of Transportation
Stations of Tokyo Metro
Railway stations in Tokyo
Railway stations in Japan opened in 1961